Waitomo was a parliamentary electorate in the Waikato region and the King Country of New Zealand, from 1919 to 1972. The electorate was represented by four Members of Parliament.

Population centres
In the 1918 electoral redistribution, the North Island gained a further three electorates from the South Island due to faster population growth. Only two existing electorates were unaltered, five electorates were abolished, two former electorate were re-established, and three electorates, including Waitomo, were created for the first time. The  electorate was abolished through the 1918 electoral redistribution, and the vast majority of the Waitomo electorate's area had previously been in the Taumarunui electorate. Settlements that fell within the initial area of the Waitomo electorate were Ōtorohanga, Te Kuiti, Ōhura, Awakino, Mōkau, and Waitara.

History
The first representative was William Thomas Jennings of the Liberal Party. John Rolleston of the Reform Party defeated the incumbent by 3447 to 3441 votes, a majority of only six votes. Broadfoot joined the National Party in 1936 when it formed through the amalgamation of the United and Reform Parties.

In the same year, the Waitomo electorate was abolished.

Members of Parliament
The Waitomo electorate was represented by four Members of Parliament:

Key

Election results

1935 election

1928 election

Notes

References

Historical electorates of New Zealand
1919 establishments in New Zealand
1972 disestablishments in New Zealand